Judd Trichter is an American writer and former actor. He starred in the 1994 British family fantasy Stanley's Dragon. He has also appeared on television, stage, commercials and film. He has written for The Idiot Magazine and for his blog called Filth. His debut novel Love in the Age of Mechanical Reproduction was released in 2015.

Career
Trichter's writings explore themes of sexual perversion, drug abuse, and Marxist revolution.  His stories feature dark humor and pessimistic depictions of an America with decaying values.

Trichter guest starred on shows including: Requiem (The X-Files), Murphy Brown, This Is Not Happening (The X-Files), ER, Chicago Hope,  The Huntress, JAG, Dear John, Law and Order and Bones episode The Man in the Morgue.

References

External links 
juddtrichter.com website

Living people
American male novelists
American male film actors
Place of birth missing (living people)
Year of birth missing (living people)
American male television actors
21st-century American novelists
20th-century American male actors
21st-century American male actors
21st-century American male writers